The 1965 New York Jets season was the sixth season for the team in the American Football League (AFL). The season began with the team trying to improve on their 5–8–1 record from 1964 under head coach Weeb Ewbank. The Jets finished the season 5–8–1, their third consecutive season with that record.

The Jets changed their primary logo in 1965, reversing the colors and slightly enlarging the helmet decal, which was now solid green with white lettering ("JETS" in thick sans-serif italics in front of "NY" in outline serif lettering) and a white miniature football at bottom center.

Offseason

Draft

Roster

Regular season

Schedule

Standings

Awards and honors
 Joe Namath, Offensive MVP, AFL All-Star Game,  UPI Rookie of the Year

External links
1965 team stats

New York Jets seasons
New York Jets
New York Jets
1960s in Queens